The successor of the OM617 engine family was the newly developed straight-5 diesel automobile engine OM602 from Mercedes-Benz used from 1980s up to 2002. With some OM602 Powered Mercedes-Benz vehicles exceeding , it is considered to be one of the most reliable engines ever produced, a success which is only comparable with the famous OM617 engine.

It is closely related to the 4 cylinder OM601 and the 6 cylinder OM603 engine families of the same era.

The 5-cylinder OM602 was succeeded by the four-valve OM605 engine and later the OM612 and OM647 engines with turbocharger and common rail direct injection.

The engine
The  was used in the 310D and 410D Mercedes-Benz T1 and the Phase 1 Mercedes-Benz Sprinter vans (where it was modified for direct injection), the Ssangyong Musso, Korando and Rexton range and even in the 1996–1999 models of the E-class. 
It was available in either naturally aspirated or turbocharged variants with two valves per cylinder.

The camshafts and injection pump are driven by duplex chain from the crankshaft. A separate single-row chain drives the oil pump. The camshaft operated the valves via hydraulic bucket tappets; valve clearance adjustment is automatic.

On many OM602 engines fuel injection is indirect. A Bosch PES in-line injection pump is used, with a mechanical governor and vacuum-operated stop control. The pump is lubricated by a connection to the engine oil circulation and the fuel lift pump is mounted on the side of the injection pump. 

Some later versions of the  capacity unit use a Bosch VE-style rotary distributor injection pump with electronic control and have a significantly different combustion chamber as they use direct injection.

Preheating is by glow plugs with automatic control of preheating time.

Versions of OM602 Mercedes 5-cylinder diesel engine

OM602
Diesel engines by model
Straight-five engines